Jai Hanuman was a 2018-2019 Indian Kannada-language soap opera which premiered on Udaya TV from 8 October 2018 and ended on 20 February 2019. Produced by Contiloe Pictures Pvt Ltd it starred Master Pradyumna in lead role and Priyanka Chincholi, Prasanna in pivotal roles. It is the remake of the Hindi serial Sankat Mochan Mahabali Hanumaan.

The show was retelecasted in Udaya TV in 2021.

Plot 
The show portrays the story of Lord Hanuman and how he was an incarnation of Lord Shiva who took birth to aid Lord Rama in killing King Ravana.

Cast 
 Master Pradyumna as Hanuman
 Priyanka Chincholi as Anjana
 Prasanna as Kesari
 Vinaya Gowda as Ravana
 Madhumitha H as Lakshmi

Dubbed versions

References 

2018 Indian television series debuts
Kannada-language television shows
Udaya TV original programming